MacEwan station is an Edmonton Light Rail Transit station on  the Metro Line in Edmonton, Alberta, Canada. It is located across from MacEwan University on 105 Avenue between 103 and 104 Street. The station opened on September 6, 2015.

History
Construction of the first phase of the project that links the station with Churchill station began in fall 2009 with completion originally set for early 2014.

It was announced on August 31, 2009, that the Katz Group had bought the land adjacent to the site for the MacEwan Station, with the intention to build Rogers Place, a new NHL arena. That development became known as the Ice District.

Around the station
MacEwan University
Bell Tower
Boyle Street Education Centre
Central McDougall
CN Tower
Chinatown
Downtown
Epcor Tower
McCauley
Ice District
Edmonton Tower
Rogers Place
Stantec Tower

References

Edmonton Light Rail Transit stations
Ice District
MacEwan University
Railway stations in Canada at university and college campuses
Railway stations in Canada opened in 2015
Metro Line